Meilhan-sur-Garonne (literally Meilhan on Garonne; Meilhan before 1919) is a commune in the Lot-et-Garonne department in south-western France.

See also

Communes of the Lot-et-Garonne department

References

Meilhansurgaronne